The 2013–14 TSV 1860 Munich season is the 108th season in the club's football history.

Background

1860 München signed Daniel Adlung. Markus Ziereis left 1860 München.

Transfers

In

Out

Pre–season

Pre–season review

Pre–season results

Legend

2. Bundesliga

2. Bundesliga review

Matchdays 1–17

1860 München started their season against FC St. Pauli on 19 July with a 1–0 loss. Lennart Thy scored for St. Pauli. 1860 München finished the matchday tied for 14th place with Energie Cottbus, FSV Frankfurt, and Paderborn 07. Then 1860 München finished July against FSV Frankfurt on matchday two on 28 July. 1860 München won 2–1. Benjamin Lauth and Moritz Stoppelkamp scored for 1860 München and Mathew Leckie scored for Frankfurt. 1860 München finished the matchday in ninth place.

Matchdays 18–34

2. Bundesliga fixtures and results

Legend

2. Bundesliga fixtures and results

League table

Table by matchday

DfB–Pokal

DFB–Pokal review

The first round draw took place on 15 June. 1860 München were drawn against 1. FC Heidenheim. The match took place on 2 August. Regular time ended 1–1 and the match went into extra time. There was no scoring in either extra time period and went to kicks from the penalty mark where 1860 München won the shoot–out.

DFB–Pokal results

Legend

DFB–Pokal results

Player information

Squad and statistics

Appearances and goals

|-
!colspan="10"| Players who have left the club after the season started.

|}

Notes
1.Kickoff time in Central European Time/Central European Summer Time.
2.1860 München goals listed first.
3.1860 München won 4–3 in a shoot–out.
4.The match finished at the end of extra time.

References

TSV 1860 Munich seasons
1860 Munchen season 2013–14